Gédéon Tallemant, Sieur des Réaux (7 November 1619 – 6 November 1692) was a French writer known for his Historiettes, a collection of short biographies.

Biography
Born at La Rochelle, he belonged to a wealthy middle-class Huguenot family; the name des Réaux was derived from a small property he purchased in 1650. When he was about eighteen, he was sent to Italy with his brother François, abbé Tallemant. On his return to Paris, Tallemant took his degrees in civil law and Canon law, and his father obtained for him the position of conseiller au parlement. Disliking his profession, he decided to seek an alternative income by marriage with his cousin Elisabeth de Rambouillet. His half-brother had married a d'Angennes, and this connection secured for Tallemant an introduction to the Hôtel de Rambouillet.

Madame de Rambouillet was no admirer of King Louis XIII, and she gratified Tallemant's curiosity with stories of the reigns of Henry IV and Louis XIII that were of real historical value. The society of the Hôtel de Rambouillet opened a field for his acute and somewhat malicious observation. In the Historiettes he gives finished portraits of Vincent Voiture, Jean Louis Guez de Balzac, Malherbe, Jean Chapelain, Valentin Conrart and many others; Blaise Pascal and Jean de la Fontaine appear in his work; and he chronicles the scandals of which Ninon de l'Enclos and Angélique Paulet were centres.

The Historiettes are invaluable for the literary history of the time. It has been said that the malicious intention of Tallemant's work may be partly attributed to his bourgeois extraction and that the slights he received are avenged in his pages, but independent testimony has established the substantial correctness of his statements. In 1685 he converted to Catholicism. It seems that the change was not entirely disinterested, for Tallemant, who had suffered considerable pecuniary losses, soon after received a pension of 2,000 livres. He died in Paris.

Works
Des Réaux was a poet and contributed to the Guirlande de Julie, but it is by his Historiettes that he is remembered. The work remained in manuscript until it was edited in 1834-6 by MM. de Châteaugiron, Jules Taschereau and Louis Monmerqué, with a notice on Tallemant by Monmerqué. A third edition (6 vols. 1872) contains a notice by Paulin Paris. Tallemant had begun Mémoires pour la régence d'Anne d'Autriche, but the manuscript has not been found.

References

External links
 
 
 Historiettes (in 17th century French)

1619 births
1692 deaths
People from La Rochelle
Converts to Roman Catholicism from Calvinism
French Roman Catholics
French biographers
French poets
17th-century French writers
17th-century French male writers
French male poets
French male non-fiction writers
Male biographers